The 2009 Women's European Union Amateur Boxing Championships were held in Pazardzhik, Bulgaria from June 24 to 28. The event, an annual competition, was the fourth since its conception. It was organised by the European Boxing Confederation (EUBC) and 62 fighters from 12 federations participated in 11 weight divisions.

Medal winners

Medal count table

References

2009 Women's European Union Amateur Boxing Championships
International boxing competitions hosted by Bulgaria
Women's European Union Amateur Boxing Championships
European